Distortland is the ninth studio album by American alternative rock band The Dandy Warhols, released on April 8, 2016 by record label Dine Alone.

Background and content 
Following the band's eighth studio album This Machine in 2012, the band released the stand-alone single "Chauncey P vs. All the Girls in London" in 2015, which was reworked and included on Distortland under the shortened title "All the Girls in London". Along with "STYGGO", then presented in its full title "Some Things You Gotta Get Over", and "You Are Killing Me", the song was often played during the band's 2015 tour.

Release 
Three singles were released to promote the album: "You Are Killing Me" on January 8, 2016, for which a music video was made, "STYGGO" on March 3 and "Catcher in the Rye" on March 25, though only "You Are Killing Me" was made available for purchase.

Distortland was released on April 8 by record label Dine Alone. One further single, "Catcher in the Rye", was released though only "You Are Killing Me" was made available for purchase.

Reception 

Distortland received generally favorable reviews from critics. Drowned in Sound wrote: "Distortland represents the kind of mix and match bag of tricks we've come to expect from The Dandy Warhols and while not quite attaining classic status, is a welcome return for a band who've never been afraid to stick two fingers in the face of adversity", while MusicOMH wrote that the album "too often sounds like a diluted version of what's gone before, a collection that struggles to reach the highs of old. The band's biggest fans are likely to go through a multitude of emotions before accepting that, as evidenced by Taylor-Taylor's increasingly breathless vocals, this might just be the first signs of their favourite band finally running out of puff and coming down."

Track listing

Charts

References

External links 
 

The Dandy Warhols albums
2016 albums
Neo-psychedelia albums